Edes is a surname. It may refer to:

 Benjamin Edes (1732–1803), American journalist and political agitator
 Elmer Edes (1937–2014), American handball player
 Gordon Edes (born 1954), American sportswriter
 Richard Edes (1555–1604), English churchman
 William C. Edes (1856-1922), American civil engineer

Other uses 
National Republican Greek League, a Greek World War II resistance group

See also
 Ede (disambiguation)
 Eedes